Stödtlen is a municipality in Baden-Württemberg, Germany, located in the Ostalbkreis district. It has about 2000 inhabitants.

Mayors
1898–1927      Benedikt Staiger (father)
1927–1974      Benedikt Staiger (son)
1974–1998      Albert Munz
since 1998      Ralf Leinberger

References

External links
  

Ostalbkreis
Württemberg